Wilmington (Patterson) is a village in Greene County, Illinois, United States. The population was 142 at the 2010 census.

Geography
Wilmington (Patterson) is located in northwestern Greene County at  (39.482514, -90.489683).

Demographics

As of the census of 2000, there were 120 people, 44 households, and 33 families residing in the village. The racial makeup of the village was 97.50% White and 2.50% Native American.

There were 44 households, out of which 31.8% had children under the age of 18 living with them, 59.1% were married couples living together, 13.6% had a female householder with no husband present, and 25.0% were non-families. 25.0% of all households were made up of individuals, and 11.4% had someone living alone who was 65 years of age or older. The average household size was 2.73 and the average family size was 3.12.

In the village, the population was spread out, with 30.8% under the age of 18, 5.8% from 18 to 24, 29.2% from 25 to 44, 20.8% from 45 to 64, and 13.3% who were 65 years of age or older. The median age was 35 years. For every 100 females, there were 90.5 males. For every 100 females age 18 and over, there were 88.6 males.

The median income for a household in the village was $33,750, and the median income for a family was $42,679. Males had a median income of $25,938 versus $24,375 for females. The per capita income for the village was $14,670. There were no families and 2.7% of the population living below the poverty line, including no under eighteens and 22.2% of those over 64.

References

External links

Villages in Greene County, Illinois
Villages in Illinois